To Stay Alive (translit. Bemani, Romanized as Bemāni) is a 2002 Iranian drama film directed by Dariush Mehrjui. It was screened in the Un Certain Regard section at the 2002 Cannes Film Festival.

Cast
 Neda Aghaei
 Masoumeh Bakhshi
 Shadi Heydari

References

External links
 

2002 films
Iranian drama films
2000s Persian-language films
2002 drama films
Films directed by Dariush Mehrjui